Giosuè Bonomi (born 21 October 1978 in Gazzaniga) is an Italian professional road bicycle racer who rode for UCI Professional Continental team  until the team's demise.

Major results
2004
3rd Coppa Bernocchi
2006
2nd Coppa Bernocchi
3rd Overall GP Costa Azul

External links 

1978 births
Living people
Italian male cyclists
Cyclists from the Province of Bergamo
People from Gazzaniga